Grzegorz Łazarek (8 December 1964 – 14 January 2018) was a Polish football midfielder.

References

1964 births
2018 deaths
Polish footballers
Association football midfielders
Lech Poznań players
Lechia Gdańsk players
Gwardia Warsaw players
Ekstraklasa players
I liga players